The year 1841 in science and technology involved some significant events, listed below.

Biology
 Rev. Miles Joseph Berkeley demonstrates that Phytophthora infestans (potato blight) is a fungal infection.
 Royal Botanic Gardens, Kew, first open to the public and William Hooker appointed director.
 John Gould begins publication of A Monograph of the Macropodidae, or Family of Kangaroos.

Chemistry
 Theobromine is first discovered in cacao beans by Russian chemist Alexander Woskresensky.
 Uranium is first isolated, by Eugène-Melchior Péligot.
 Chemical Society of London founded by Thomas Graham.
 Reinsch test for heavy metals discovered by Hugo Reinsch.

Exploration
 January 27 – The active volcano Mount Erebus in Antarctica is discovered and named by James Clark Ross.
 January 28 – Ross discovers the "Victoria Barrier", later known as the Ross Ice Shelf.
 Ross additionally discovers the Ross Sea, Victoria Land and Mount Terror.

Geology
 Hugh Miller publishes The Old Red Sandstone.
  The first comprehensive geological map of France  is published by Dufrénoy and Élie de Beaumont, the result  of thirteen years of  investigations.

Human sciences
 November 13 – Scottish surgeon James Braid attends his first demonstration of animal magnetism (given by Charles Lafontaine in Manchester, England) which leads to Braid's study of the subject he eventually calls hypnotism.

Mathematics
 Prussian mathematician Karl Weierstrass discovers but does not publish the Laurent expansion theorem.
 English mathematician William Rutherford calculates an approximation of π to 208 decimal places of which the first 152 are correct.

Physiology and medicine
 Platelets are first described from microscopic observation by George Gulliver.

Technology
 February – H. Fox Talbot obtains a patent in the United Kingdom for the calotype process in photography.
 April 16 – Loring Coes patents the screw type wrench commonly known as the monkey wrench in the United States.
 April 24 – Squire Whipple patents the iron bowstring arch through truss bridge in the United States.
 Draughtsman William Howe and pattern-maker William Williams of Robert Stephenson and Company in Newcastle upon Tyne originate Stephenson valve gear for the steam locomotive.
 Joseph Whitworth introduces the British Standard Whitworth system of screw threads in his paper On a Uniform System of Screw Threads.
 American artist John G. Rand invents the collapsible zinc oil paint tube, marketed by Winsor & Newton of London.

Awards
 Copley Medal: Georg Ohm
 Wollaston Medal: Adolphe Theodore Brongniart

Births
 January 29 – Henry Morton Stanley (died 1904), explorer, journalist.
 February 2 – François-Alphonse Forel (died 1912), pioneer in the study of lakes.
 February 4 – Clément Ader (died 1926), engineer and inventor, airplane pioneer.
 February 24 – Carl Gräbe, (died 1927) chemist.
 March 6 – Alfred Cornu (died 1902), physicist.
 August 4 – W. H. Hudson (died 1922), naturalist.
 August 25 – Emil Theodor Kocher (died 1917), 1909 winner of the Nobel Prize in Physiology or Medicine
 October 12 – Joseph O'Dwyer (died 1898), physician
 October 26 – Theodor von Oppolzer (died 1886), astronomer.
 November 3 – Eugen Warming (died 1924), botanist and founder of ecology.
 December 29 – Rosalie Fougelberg (d. 1911), Swedish dentist

Deaths
 April 22 – Charles Barbier, inventor of a method of writing for the blind that was the inspiration for Braille.
 May 16 – Marie Boivin, French midwife, inventor and obstetrics writer (born 1773)
 May 31 – George Green (born 1793), English mathematician.
 August 18 – Louis de Freycinet (born 1779), explored coastal regions of Western Australia.
 September 9 – Augustin Pyramus de Candolle (born 1778), Swiss botanist.
 October 28 – Johan August Arfwedson (born 1792), Swedish chemist.

References

 
19th century in science
1840s in science